The women's long jump was an event at the 1956 Summer Olympics in Melbourne, Australia. The qualification mark was set at 5.70 metres. Seven athletes didn't surpass that distance in the morning heats.

Summary
In the final, the three medalists separated from the rest of the field on their first attempts, just as they had in qualifying.  Elżbieta Krzesińska, who had set the world record three months earlier, jumped 6.20m, Nadezhda Khnykina-Dvalishvili went 6.00 meters exactly and 16 year old Willye White jumped 5.96m.  In the second round, Krzesińska equalled her world record .  In the third round, White jumped 6.06m to move into silver position.  On her fifth attempt Khnykina-Dvalishvili edged into silver with a 6.07m jump.  On her final attempt, White jumped 6.09m to take the silver for good.  16 years later, White was still a finalist in 1972.

Final classification

References

External links
 Official Report
 Results

W
Long jump at the Olympics
1956 in women's athletics
Ath